UPCN Voley or UPCN San Juan is an Argentine volleyball club based in San Juan. The club was founded in 2007 and takes part of Liga Argentina de Voleibol – Serie A1, the top level of the Argentine men's volleyball league system, since 2009–10 season. It has won 5 consecutive national championships between 2011 and 2015, becoming one of the most successful clubs on the league's history.

Titles

Domestic
Liga Argentina A1
First Place (6): 2010–11, 2011–12, 2012–13, 2013–14, 2014–15, 2015-16
Copa ACLAV
First Place (2): 2012, 2013

International
Men's South American Volleyball Club Championship 
First Place (2): 2013, 2015
FIVB Volleyball Men's Club World Championship 
Third Place (2): 2014, 2015

External links

 Official Website

References 

Argentine volleyball teams